The 2016–17 season of the Serie A Elite is played by 17 Italian women's futsal  teams.

Teams

References

2016 in Italian sport
2017 in Italian sport
2016–17 in European futsal